For other people named Jonathan Burrows, see Jonathan Burrows (disambiguation).

Jonathan Burrows (born December 31, 1942), is an American film and Broadway theater producer.  His is best known for producing Texasville and Fletch.

Early career 
Burrows began his professional career as a stage manager in summer stock (The Music Fair circuit - Jose Ferrer/Lee Remick, Town & Country Playhouse, Cherry County Playhouse - Vivian Vance, Andy Devine, Joe Flynn, Bermuda Festival of the Arts) followed by 3 seasons as assistant stage director at the New York City Opera (1966) with Placido Domingo in Carmen, La Traviata and Madama Butterfly, Beverly Sills in The Tales of the Hoffman and many more. Two years later he was producing theatre in New York, presenting three off-Broadway plays - Athol Fugard’s Hello & Goodbye (Martin Sheen & Colleen Dewhurst) directed by George C. Scott, Contributions (Claudia McNeil), the national tour of The Mad Show - and Fire on Broadway (1969), prior to turning his attention to the film industry.

He started there as an assistant director for David Lean on  Ryan's Daughter (Robert Mitchum, John Mills, MGM, 1970). After joining Columbia Pictures in New York in 1970, where he worked in the Business Affairs Department while being trained to be the assistant to then President Stanley Schneider, he worked for Ely Landau at the American Film Theatre as a Production Executive on A Delicate Balance (Katharine Hepburn, Paul Scofield), The Iceman Cometh (Lee Marvin, Jeff Bridges), Eugene Ionesco's Rhinoceros (Zero Mostel, Gene Wilder), The Homecoming (Ian Holm), and The Man In the Glass Booth (Maximilian Schell). Burrows served as a producer for Texasville (Jeff Bridges, Columbia, 1990) and Fletch (Chevy Chase, Universal, 1984).

Broadway 
In 1969 when he was 26 Burrows produced Fire at the Longacre Theater - "Rips into an audience with volcanic force" Time Magazine, "A total brilliance that dazzles the mind" Boston Globe. Many years later he prepared a Broadway production of Cole Porter’s 1953 musical Can-Can for the New York winter season 2017-2018. He discovered this new production of Can-Can at the Pasadena Playhouse in 2010 and presented it in showcase in NYC in July 2013 (Megan Hilty & Aaron Lazar). In October 2014 it played four weeks as a pre-Broadway tryout (Kate Baldwin & Jason Danieley) at Paper Mill Playhouse.  In 1969, off-Broadway, along with Kermit Bloomgarden, he produced Athol Fugard's Hello and Goodbye  (Colleen Dewhurst & Martin Sheen) directed by George C. Scott, followed in 1970 by Ted Shine's Contributions (Claudia McNeil). He discovered Contributions at the NEC (Negro Ensemble Company) and it became an important early introduction to black theater in America which was not then represented by many non-politicized, non-racially themed plays.  He also produced the National Tour of The Mad Show (1968) (by Mary Rodgers, Stephen Sondheim, Larry Siegel).

Stage Credits

Personal life 
Burrows is married to Annie Burrows.  They have 2 children. Jonathan is a cousin of James Burrows.  He is also the nephew of Abe Burrows.

Restaurateur 
A graduate of the Los Angeles based Epicurean School of the Culinary Arts, between 2000 and 2013 Burrows owned Mr. Cecil's California Ribs (www.mrcecilscaribs.com), three celebrated BBQ restaurants in Los Angeles.  “I was very lucky to have had close to 35 successful years in the industry and now I feel as though it’s time to pursue yet another dream.”  Joining him in this venture were partners attorney Ken Burrows & Erica Jong (brother & sister-in-law), TV producer/director Jim Burrows (cousin) and Larry Jackson (film industry executive). The L.A. Times called his food “plates of meat to dream about” (this was shortly after opening, bringing sell-out crowds and causing Mr.Cecil's to close for three days in order to replenish food stocks). Bon Appetit Magazine included Jonathan (among 20 in the country) in its Who’s Who In American Barbeque. The uniqueness of his ribs is that Burrows takes western American barbeque, adds a slight Asian influence, then infuses California freshness and the highest quality ingredients.  The second Mr. Cecil’s opened in January 2003 in Sherman Oaks, California and the third in 2008 in Manhattan Beach, California.  During this period he cooked at events throughout the country, including NYC's Big Apple BBQ Block Party and was twice invited as guest chef to cook at the prestigious James Beard House in NYC.  Mr. Cecil was a nickname he jokingly gave his father Selig Burrows whose first name was occasionally mispronounced by strangers.

Filmography 
 Texasville (Associate Producer, 1990)
 Fletch (Produced by Special Arrangement, 1985)
 The Rovers (Short United ArtistsMGM) (Writer/Producer, 1976 https://www.imdb.com/videoplayer/vi3495540249)
 The Man in the Glass Booth (Production Executive, 1975)
 Rhinoceros (Production Executive, 1974) 
 A Delicate Balance (Productive Executive, 1973)
 The Iceman Cometh (Productive Executive, 1973)
 The Homecoming (Productive Executive, 1973)
 Ryan's Daughter (Third Assistant Director, 1970)

References 
        6. "The Rovers" -minute short film United Artists/MGM https://www.imdb.com/videoplayer/vi3495540249

Living people
1942 births
American film producers
American theatre managers and producers